Polymorphus is a genus of parasitic worms from the phylum Acanthocephala. This group uses amphipod crustaceans as intermediate hosts and various birds as final hosts.

The genus used to be a larger group, but species that were formerly placed in the genus have now been placed in the genus Profilicollis based on morphological characteristics and the use of decapod crustaceans as intermediate hosts.

Species
 Polymorphus actuganensis Petrochenko, 1949
 Polymorphus acutis Van Cleave and Starrett, 1940
 Polymorphus arctocephali Smales, 1986
 Polymorphus ariusis (Bilqees, 1971)
 Polymorphus biziurae Johnston and Edmonds, 1948
 Polymorphus boschadis (Schrank, 1788)
 Polymorphus brevis (Van Cleave, 1916)
 Polymorphus chongqingensis Liu, Zhang and Zhang, 1990
 Polymorphus cincli Belopolskaya, 1959
 Polymorphus contortus (Bremser in Westrumb, 1821)
 Polymorphus corynoides Skrjabin, 1913
 Polymorphus corynosoma Travassos, 1915
 Polymorphus crassus Van Cleave, 1924
 Polymorphus cucullatus Van Cleave and Starrett, 1940
 Polymorphus diploinflatus Lundström, 1942
 Polymorphus fatimaae Khan, Dharejo, Birmani and Bilqees, 2008
 Polymorphus fulicai Birmani, Dharejo and Khan, 2011
 Polymorphus gavii Hokhlova, 1965
 Polymorphus inermis Travassos, 1923
 Polymorphus karachiensis (Bilqees, 1971)
 Polymorphus kostylewi Petrochenko, 1949
 Polymorphus magnus Skrjabin, 1913
 Polymorphus marchii (Porta, 1910)
 Polymorphus marilis Van Cleave, 1939
 Polymorphus mathevossianae Petrochenko, 1949
 Polymorphus meyeri Lundström, 1942
 Polymorphus miniatus (von Linstow, 1896)
 Polymorphus minutus (Goeze, 1782)
 Polymorphus mohiuddini Muti-ur-Rahman, Khan, Bilqees and Khatoon, 2008
 Polymorphus mutabilis (Rudolphi, 1819)
 Polymorphus nickoli Khan and Bilqees, 1998
 Polymorphus obtusus Van Cleave, 1918
 Polymorphus paradoxus Connell and Corner, 1957
 Polymorphus paucihamatus Heinze, 1936
 Polymorphus phippsi Kostylew, 1922
 Polymorphus piriformis (Bremser in Rudolphi, 1819)
 Polymorphus pupa (von Linstow, 1905)
 Polymorphus sichuanensis Wang and Zhang, 1987
 Polymorphus sindensis Khan, Ghazi and Bilqees, 2002
 Polymorphus spindlatus Amin and Heckmann, 1991
 Polymorphus striatus (Goeze, 1782)
 Polymorphus strumosoides Lundström, 1942
 Polymorphus swartzi Schmidt, 1965
 Polymorphus trochus Van Cleave, 1945

References

Polymorphidae
Acanthocephala genera
Parasites of birds